How's It Going? is the third studio album by Japanese boy band Arashi. The album was released in Japan on July 9, 2003, under their record label J Storm in two editions: a regular and limited edition, with the latter bearing a different cover art and a booklet. It was released digitally on February 7, 2020.

Singles
The album contains the singles "Tomadoi Nagara", theme song for the drama Yoiko no Mikata starring Sho Sakurai and a new version of "Pikanchi", the theme song for the movie Pikanchi: Life is Hard Dakedo Happy, which all five members of the group co-starred in.

Track listing

Charts and certifications

Weekly charts

Certifications

References

External links
How's It Going? product information 

Arashi albums
2003 albums
J Storm albums